Wilbert Ellis Field at Ralph Waldo Emerson Jones Park is a baseball venue in Grambling, Louisiana, United States.

It is home to the Grambling State Tigers baseball team of the NCAA Division I Southwestern Athletic Conference. The field is named after Wilbert Ellis, former head baseball coach and the park is named after Grambling's second president, Ralph Waldo Emerson Jones.

See also
 Grambling State Tigers baseball
 List of NCAA Division I baseball venues

References

External links
 

Baseball venues in Louisiana
College baseball venues in the United States
Grambling State Tigers baseball
Sports venues in Grambling, Louisiana
Buildings and structures in Lincoln Parish, Louisiana